Fernand Carton (4 September 1921 – 16 November 2019) was a French linguist who specialized in Picardic dialects.

Biography
After passing the Agrégation de Lettres classiques exams in 1958, Carton published numerous articles in the field of phonetics. He became a fellow of the Royal Society of Canada and President of the Language Sciences section of the national committee of the French National Centre for Scientific Research. He also served as President of Nancy 2 University and University of Lorraine. He published a linguistic atlas of the Picard language, and adapted the Feller-Carton dialect transcription system.

References

Linguists from France
Fellows of the Royal Society of Canada
Academic staff of Nancy-Université
Academic staff of the University of Lorraine
1921 births
2019 deaths
Picard language